Peng Shi from the University of Adelaide, Australia was named Fellow of the Institute of Electrical and Electronics Engineers (IEEE) in 2015 for contributions to control and filtering techniques for hybrid dynamical systems.

References 

Fellow Members of the IEEE
Living people
Academic staff of the University of Adelaide
Australian electrical engineers
University of Adelaide alumni
University of South Australia alumni
Year of birth missing (living people)